Prevešt (Serbian Cyrillic: Превешт) is a village in Šumadija and Western Serbia (Šumadija), in the municipality of Rekovac (Region of Levač), lying at , at the elevation of 370 m. According to the 2002 census, the village had 338 citizens.

External links
 Levac Online
 Article about Prevešt
 Pictures from Prevešt

Populated places in Pomoravlje District
Šumadija